Cholly is a given name or nickname that may refer to:

 Cholly Atkins (1913–2003), American dancer and choreographer
 Cholly Knickerbocker, pseudonym
 Cholly Naranjo (1934–2022), Cuban baseball pitcher
 Cholly, a Chalicotherium in Ice Age 2: The Meltdown